Frösö IF is a Swedish football club located in Frösön which is west of the city Östersund in Jämtland.

Background
Frösö Idrottsförening was officially founded on 3 April 1921 when the formal constitution was laid down but records indicate that the sports club was in existence 10 years earlier, having been formed by a bunch of sports fans who got together in 1910. They called themselves "Bergviksgrabbarna" (Bergvik boys) and concentrated their efforts on football and track and field disciplines, including shot put and javelin. The club has since specialised in a wide range of sports including athletics, bandy, bowling, football, handball, floorball, karting, orienteering, skiing, table tennis, casting (fishing) and weightlifting.

Since their foundation Frösö IF has participated mainly in the middle and lower divisions of the Swedish football league system.  The football club began to play friendly matches from 1923 to 1924. In 1964 Frösö IF competed for the first time in Sweden's third division and in 1968 they played one season in Sweden's second division which was followed by relegation. The club currently plays in Division 3 Mellersta Norrland which is the fifth tier of Swedish football. They play their home matches at the Lövsta Aktivitetscenter in Frösön.

Frösö IF are affiliated to the Jämtland-Härjedalens FF.

Season to season

Attendances

In recent seasons Frösö IF have had the following average attendances:

The attendance record for Frösö IF was around 1,500 spectators for the match against IFK Östersund in 1967.

Footnotes

External links
 Frösö IF – Official club website
 Frösö IF – Football club website

Football clubs in Jämtland County
Orienteering clubs in Sweden
Association football clubs established in 1921
1921 establishments in Sweden